Abdollahi (also Romanized as ‘Abdollāhī, ‘Abdolahī, and ‘Abdolláhī) is a village in Shohada Rural District, Yaneh Sar District, Behshahr County, Mazandaran Province, Iran. At the 2006 census, its population was 227, in 57 families.

References 

Populated places in Behshahr County